The Carolina pygmy sunfish, Elassoma boehlkei, is a species of pygmy sunfish endemic to the United States, where it is only known from the Waccamaw and Santee River drainages in the Carolinas. This species prefers waters with dense vegetation. It can reach  in total length, though most do not exceed . This species can also be found in the aquarium trade.

References

External links
 Photograph

Elassoma
Endemic fauna of the United States
Fish of the United States
Fish described in 1987
Taxonomy articles created by Polbot